Betta ibanorum (commonly known as the Iban Fightingfish) is a species of gourami endemic to southern Sarawak in Malaysia. The species name ibanorum was named after the Iban people, the largest group of people in the Sarawak (it means "of the Iban").  This species is a mouthbrooder, and grows to a length of  SL.

References

ibanorum
Taxa named by Heok Hui Tan
Taxa named by Ng Peter Kee Lin
Fish described in 2004